Community wealth building is a term which covers a range of approaches which "...aim at improving the ability of communities and individuals to increase asset ownership, anchor jobs locally by broadening ownership over capital, help achieve key environmental goals, expand the provision of public services and ensure local economic stability”. The original model, the Cleveland Model, was developed in Cleveland, United States, however the Cleveland Model has also been developed and applied with the creation of the "Preston Model", in Preston, Lancashire. It is a form of municipal socialism which utilises anchor institutions, living wage expansion, community banking, public pension investment, worker ownership and municipal enterprise tied to a procurement strategy at the municipal level.

Preston Model
The Preston Model is an approach to community wealth building pioneered by Preston City Council, Lancashire, England. It is a form of municipal socialism which utilises anchor institutions, living wage expansion, community banking, public pension investment, worker ownership and municipal enterprise tied to a procurement strategy at the municipal level. It is based on projects developed in Cleveland, Ohio and Mondragon, Spain. Councillor Matt Brown, originally Executive Member for Social Justice, Inclusion and Policy, played a key role in developing the model with his colleague Councillor Martyn Rawlinson, working in conjunction with the Centre for Local Economic Strategies. The first issue they tackled in 2012-2013 was to localise their procurement spend in Preston and the surrounding county of Lancashire. Former Shadow Chancellor of the Exchequer John McDonnell was a vocal supporter of the project during his time on the frontbenches.

Criticism 
The plan has been criticised by some members of Preston City Council. The leader of the council Liberal Democrat group described it as a 'marketing gimmick' that has not had a substantial effect on the local area, and that locals are not interested in project. Critics have also pointed out Preston relies heavily on multi-national companies for employment, and that local procurement isn't the answer to everything, despite being a useful tool.

See also
 Community-supported agriculture
 Using smartphone for calculating food miles
 Local food
 Gar Alperovitz - political economist who has researched and advocated community wealth building

References

External links
 FarmShare: Blockchain Community-Supported Agriculture

Political terminology
Politics of Lancashire